Chinedu may refer to:

Chinedu Achebe (born 1977), former American football fullback/linebacker
Blessing Chinedu (born 1976), retired Nigerian football defender
Geoffrey Chinedu (born 1997), Nigerian footballer
Stephen Chinedu (born 2000), Nigerian professional footballer
Chinedu Sunday Chukwu (born 1997), Nigerian professional footballer
Chinedu Ede (born 1987), German former professional footballer
Chinedu Ekene (born 2001), German-Nigerian professional footballer
Chinedu Ezimora (born 1985), Nigerian football (soccer) player
Chinedu Ikedieze, MFR (born 1977), Nigerian actor, entrepreneur and serial investor
Chinedu Obasi (born 1986), Nigerian professional footballer
Chinedu Odozor-Onikeku (born 1977), Nigerian long jumper
Chamberlain Chinedu Ogunedo, Anglican bishop in Nigeria
Obiora Chinedu Okafor, Canadian lawyer, the York Research Chair at Osgoode Hall Law School, York University
Charles Chinedu Okeahalam, economist and businessman, co-founder of the investment group AGH Capital
Chinedu Oriala (born 1981), track and field sprint athlete
Chinedu Udoji (1989–2018), Nigerian professional footballer
Chinedu Udoka (born 1992), Nigerian footballer

See also
Chennadu
Chindu (disambiguation)
Chinnodu